In 20th-century discussions of Karl Marx's economics, the transformation problem is the problem of finding a general rule by which to transform the "values" of commodities (based on their socially necessary labour content, according to his labour theory of value) into the "competitive prices" of the marketplace. This problem was first introduced by Marx in chapter 9 of the draft of volume 3 of Capital, where he also sketched a solution. The essential difficulty was this: given that Marx derived profit, in the form of surplus value, from direct labour inputs, and that the ratio of direct labour input to capital input varied widely between commodities, how could he reconcile this with a tendency toward an average rate of profit on all capital invested among industries, if such a tendency (as predicted by Marx and Ricardo) exists?

Marx's theory 
Marx defines value as the number of hours of labor socially necessary to produce a commodity. This includes two elements: First, it includes the hours that a worker of normal skill and dedication would take to produce a commodity under average conditions and with the usual equipment (Marx terms this "living labor"). Second, it includes the labor embodied in raw materials, tools, and machinery used up or worn away during its production (which Marx terms "dead labor"). In capitalism, workers spend a portion of their working day reproducing the value of their means of subsistence, represented as wages (necessary labor), and a portion of their day producing value above and beyond that, referred to as surplus value, which goes to the capitalist (surplus labor).

Since, according to Marx, the source of capitalist profit is this surplus labor of the workers, and since in this theory only new, living labor produces value, it would appear logical that enterprises with a low organic composition (a higher proportion of capital spent on living labor) would have a higher rate of profit than would enterprises with a high organic composition (a higher proportion of capital spent on raw materials and means of production). However, in models of classical perfect competition, higher rates of profit are not generally found in enterprises with a low organic composition, and low profit rates are not generally found in enterprises with a high organic composition. Instead, there is a tendency toward equalization of the rate of profit in industries of different organic compositions. That is, in such models with no barriers to entry, capitalists are free to disinvest or invest in any industry, a tendency exists towards the formation of a general rate of profits, constant across all industries.

Marx outlined the transformation problem as a theoretical solution to this discrepancy. The tendency of the rate of profit toward equalization means that, in this theory, there is no simple translation from value to money—e.g., 1 hour of value equals 20 dollars—that is the same across every sector of the economy. While such a simple translation may hold approximately true in general, Marx postulated that there is an economy-wide, systematic deviation according to the organic compositions of the different industries, such that 1 hour of value equals 20 dollars times T, where T represents a transformation factor that varies according to the organic composition of the industry in consideration.

In this theory, T is approximately 1 in industries where the organic composition is close to average, less than 1 in industries where the organic composition is below average, and greater than 1 in industries where the organic composition is higher than average.

Because Marx was considering only socially necessary labor, this variation among industries has nothing to do with higher-paid, skilled labor versus lower-paid, unskilled labor. This transformation factor varies only with respect to the organic compositions of different industries.

British classical labor theory of value 
Marx's value theory was developed from the labor theory of value discussed by Adam Smith and used by many British classical economists. It became central to his economics.

Simplest case: labor costs only 
Consider the simple example used by Adam Smith to introduce the subject. Assume a hunters’ economy with free land, no slavery, and no significant current production of tools, in which beavers  and deer  are hunted.

In this case, Smith noticed, each hunter will be willing to exchange one deer (which costs him hours) for  beavers. The ratio —i.e., the relative quantity of labour embodied in (unit) deer production with respect to beaver production—gives thus the exchange ratio between deer and beavers, the "relative price" of deer in units of beavers. Moreover, since the only costs are here labor costs, this ratio is also the "relative unit cost" of deer for any given competitive uniform wage rate .

Capital costs 
Things become more complicated if production uses some scarce capital good as well. Now the unit total cost (or absolute competitive price) of beavers and deer becomes

where  denotes the capital cost incurred in using each arrow.

This capital cost is made up of two parts. First, there is the replacement cost of substituting the arrow when it is lost in production. Second, there is the net rental or return required by the arrows' owner (who may or may not be the same person as the hunter using it). This can be expressed as the product , where  is the (uniform) net rate of return of the system.

Summing up, and assuming a uniform replacement rate , the absolute competitive prices of beavers and deer may be written as

Yet we still have to determine the arrows' competitive price . Assuming arrows are produced by labor only, with  man-hours per arrow, we have:

Assuming further, for simplicity, that  (i.e., all arrows are lost after just one shot, so that they are circulating capital), the absolute competitive prices of beavers and deer become:

Here,  is the quantity of labor directly embodied in beaver and deer unit production, while  is the labor indirectly thus embodied, through previous arrow production. The sum of the two,

,

gives the total quantity of labor embodied.

It is now obvious that the relative competitive price of deer  can no longer be generally expressed as the ratio between total amounts of labour embodied.  With  the ratio  will correspond to  only in two very special cases: if either ; or, if . In general the two ratios will not only differ:  may change for any given , if the net rate of return or the wages vary.

For Marx, r is the quotient of surplus value to the value of capital advanced to non-labor inputs, and is typically positive in a competitive capitalist economy.

Marx's labour theory of value

Surplus value and exploitation 
Marx distinguishes between labour power as the potential to work, and labour, which is its actual use. He describes labour power as a commodity, and like all commodities, Marx assumes that on average it is exchanged at its value. Its value is determined by the value of the quantity of goods required for its reproduction.

Yet there is a difference between the value of labour power and the value produced by that labour power in its use. Unlike other commodities, in its use, labour power produces new value beyond that used up by its use. This difference is called surplus value and is for Marx the source of profit for the capitalists. The appropriation of surplus labor is what Marx denoted the exploitation of labour.

Labour as the "value-creating substance" 
Marx defined the "value" of a commodity as the total amount of socially necessary labour embodied in its production. He developed this special brand of the labour theory of value in the first chapter of volume 1 of Capital. Due to the influence of Marx's particular definition of value on the transformation problem, he is quoted at length where he argues as follows:

Let us take two commodities, e.g., corn and iron. The proportions in which they are exchangeable, whatever those proportions may be, can always be represented by an equation in which a given quantity of corn is equated to some quantity of iron: e.g., 1 quarter corn = x cwt. iron. What does this equation tell us? It tells us that in two different things—in 1 quarter of corn and x cwt. of iron, there exists in equal quantities something common to both. The two things must therefore be equal to a third, which in itself is neither the one nor the other. Each of them, so far as it is exchange value, must therefore be reducible to this third.
This common 'something' cannot be either a geometrical, a chemical, or any other natural property of commodities. Such properties claim our attention only in so far as they affect the utility of those commodities, make them use values. But the exchange of commodities is evidently an act characterised by a total abstraction from use value.
If then we leave out of consideration the use value of commodities, they have only one common property left, that of being products of labour. […] Along with the useful qualities of the products themselves, we put out of sight both the useful character of the various kinds of labour embodied in them, and the concrete forms of that labour; there is nothing left but what is common to them all; all are reduced to one and the same sort of labour, human labour in the abstract.
A use value, or useful article, therefore, has value only because human labour in the abstract has been embodied or materialised in it. How, then, is the magnitude of this value to be measured? Plainly, by the quantity of the value-creating substance, the labour, contained in the article.
—Karl Marx, Capital, Volume I, Chapter 1

 Variable and constant capital 
The quantity of value that living labour transmits to the deer, in our previous example, varies according to the intensity of the exploitation. In the previous example, .

By contrast, the value of other inputs—in our example, the indirect (or "dead") past labour embodied in the used-up arrows—is transmitted to the product as it stands, without additions. It is hence called constant capital and denoted as c. The value transmitted by the arrow to the deer can never be greater than the value of the arrow itself. In our previous example, .

 Value formulas 
The total value of each produced good is the sum of the above three elements: constant capital, variable capital, and surplus value. In our previous example:

Where  stands for the (unit) Marxian value of beavers and deer.

However, from Marx's definition of value as total labour embodied, it must also be true that:

Solving for  the above two relationships one has:

for all .

This necessarily uniform ratio  is called by Marx the rate of exploitation, and it allows to re-write Marx's value equations as:

 Classical tableaux 
Like Ricardo, Marx believed that relative labour values—  in the above example—do not generally correspond to relative competitive prices—  in the same example. However, in volume 3 of Capital he argued that competitive prices are obtained from values through a transformation process, whereby capitalists redistribute among themselves the given aggregate surplus value of the system in such a way as to bring about a tendency toward an equal rate of profit, among sectors of the economy. This happens because of the capitalists' tendency to shift their capital toward sectors where it earns higher returns. As competition becomes fierce in a given sector, the rate of return falls, while the opposite will happen in a sector with a low rate of return. Marx describes this process in detail.

Marx's reasoning 
The following two tables adapt the deer-beaver-arrow example seen above (which, of course, is not found in Marx, and is only a useful simplification) to illustrate Marx's approach. Table 1 shows how the total amount of surplus value of the system, shown in the last row, is determined.

Table 2 illustrates how Marx thought this total would be redistributed between the two industries, as "profit" at a uniform return rate, r, over constant capital. First, the condition that total "profit" must equal total surplus value—in the final row of table 2—is used to determine r. The result is then multiplied by the value of the constant capital of each industry to get its "profit". Finally, each (absolute) competitive price in labour units is obtained, as the sum of constant capital, variable capital, and "profit" per unit of output, in the last column of table 2.

Tables 1 and 2 parallel the tables in which Marx elaborated his numerical example.

Marx's supposed error and its correction 
Later scholars argued that Marx's formulas for competitive prices were mistaken.

First, competitive equilibrium requires a uniform rate of return over constant capital valued at its price, not its Marxian value, contrary to what is done in table 2 above. Second, competitive prices result from the sum of costs valued at the prices of things, not as amounts of embodied labour. Marx noted this but thought that it was not significant, stating in chapter 9 of volume 3 of Capital that "Our present analysis does not necessitate a closer examination of this point."

The simultaneous linear equations method of computing competitive (relative) prices in an equilibrium economy is today very well known. In the greatly simplified model of tables 1 and 2, where the wage rate is assumed as given and equal to the price of beavers, the most convenient way is to express such prices is in units of beavers, which means normalising . This yields the (relative) price of arrows as

 beavers.

Substituting this into the relative-price condition for beavers,

,

gives the solution for the rate of return as

Finally, the price condition for deer can hence be written as

.

This latter result, which gives the correct competitive price of deer in units of beavers for the simple model used here, is generally inconsistent with Marx's price formulae of table 2.

Ernest Mandel, defending Marx, explains this discrepancy in term of the time frame of production rather than as a logical error; i.e., in this simplified model, capital goods are purchased at a labour value price, but final products are sold under prices that reflect redistributed surplus value.

After Marx

Engels 
Friedrich Engels, the editor of volume 3 of Capital, hinted since 1894 at an alternative way to look at the matter. His view was that the pure Marxian "law of value" of volume 1 and the "transformed" prices of volume 3 applied to different periods of economic history. In particular, the "law of value" would have prevailed in pre-capitalist exchange economies, from Babylon to the 15th century, while the "transformed" prices would have materialized under capitalism: see Engels's quotation by Morishima and Catephores (1975), p. 310.

Engels's reasoning was later taken up by Meek (1956) and Nell (1973). These authors argued that, whatever one might say of his interpretation of capitalism, Marx's "value" theory retains its usefulness as a tool to interpret pre-capitalist societies, because, they maintained, in pre-capitalist exchange economies there were no "prices of production" with a uniform rate of return (or "profit") on capital. It hence follows that Marx's transformation must have had a historical dimension, given by the actual transition to capitalist production (and no more Marxian "values") at the beginning of the modern era. In this case, this true "historical transformation" could and should take the place of the mathematical transformation postulated by Marx in chapter 9 of volume 3.

Other Marxist views 
There are several schools of thought among those who see themselves as upholding or furthering Marx on the question of transformation from values to prices, or modifying his theory in ways to make it more consistent.

According to the temporal single-system interpretation of Capital advanced by Alan Freeman, Andrew Kliman, and others, Marx's writings on the subject are most robustly interpreted in such a way as to remove any supposed inconsistencies. Modern traditional Marxists argue that not only does the labour theory of value hold up today, but also that Marx's understanding of the transformation problem was in the main correct. Andrew Kliman claimed using the TSSI framework: "Simple reproduction and uniform profitability do require that supplies equal demands, but they can be equal even if the input and output prices of Period 1 are unequal. Since the outputs of one period are the inputs of the next, what is needed in order for supplies to equal demands is that the output prices of Period 1 equal the input prices of Period 2. But they are always equal; the end of one period is the start of the next, so the output prices of one period necessarily equal the input prices of the next period. Once this is recognized, Bortkiewicz’s proofs immediately fail, as was first demonstrated in Kliman and McGIone (1988)".

In the probabilistic interpretation of Marx advanced by Emmanuel Farjoun and Moshe Machover in Laws of Chaos (see references), they "dissolve" the transformation problem by reconceptualising the relevant quantities as random variables. In particular, they consider profit rates to reach an equilibrium distribution. A heuristic analogy with the statistical mechanics of an ideal gas leads them to the hypothesis that this equilibrium distribution should be a gamma distribution.

Finally, there are Marxist scholars (e.g., Anwar Shaikh, Makoto Itoh, Gerard Dumenil and Dominique Levy, and Duncan Foley) who hold that there exists no incontestable logical procedure by which to derive price magnitudes from value magnitudes, but still think that it has no lethal consequences on his system as a whole. In a few very special cases, Marx's idea of labour as the "substance" of (exchangeable) value would not be openly at odds with the facts of market competitive equilibrium. These authors have argued that such cases—though not generally observed—throw light on the "hidden" or "pure" nature of capitalist society. Thus Marx's related notions of surplus value and unpaid labour can still be treated as basically true, although they hold that the practical details of their workings are more complicated than Marx thought.

Critics of the theory 
Some mathematical economists assert that a set of functions in which Marx's equalities hold does not generally exist at the individual enterprise or aggregate level, so that chapter 9's transformation problem has no general solution, outside two very special cases. This was first pointed out by, among others, Bortkiewicz (1906). In the second half of the 20th century, Leontief’s and Sraffa’s work on linear production models provided a framework within which to argue this result in a general way.

Although he never actually mentioned the transformation problem, Sraffa’s (1960) chapter 6 on the "reduction" of prices to "dated" amounts of current and past embodied labour gave implicitly the first general proof, showing that the competitive price  of the  produced good can be expressed as

,

Since total embodied labour is defined as

,

A standard reference, with an extensive survey of the entire literature prior to 1971 and a comprehensive bibliography, is Samuelson's (1971) "Understanding the Marxian Notion of Exploitation: A Summary of the So-Called Transformation Problem Between Marxian Values and Competitive Prices" Journal of Economic Literature 9 2 399–431.

Proponents of the temporal single system interpretation such as Moseley (1999), who argue that the determination of prices by simultaneous linear equations (which assumes that prices are the same at the start and end of the production period) is logically inconsistent with the determination of value by labour time, disagree with the notion that the mathematical proof that Marx's transformation problem has no general solution. Other Marxian economists accept the proof, but reject its relevance for some key elements of Marxian political economy. Still others reject Marxian economics outright, and emphasise the politics of the assumed relations of production instead.

Non-Marxian critiques 
Mainstream scholars such as Paul Samuelson question the assumption that the basic nature of capitalist production and distribution can be gleaned from unrealistic special cases. For example, in special cases where it applies, Marx's reasoning can be turned upside down through an inverse transformation process; Samuelson argues that Marx's inference that

Profit is therefore the [bourgeois] disguise of surplus value which must be removed before the real nature of surplus value can be discovered." (Capital, volume 3, chapter 2)

could with equal cogency be "transformed" into:

Surplus value is therefore the [Marxist] disguise of profit which must be removed before the real nature of profit can be discovered.

To clarify this point, it may be noticed that the special cases in question are also precisely those where J. B. Clark's old model of aggregate marginal productivity holds strictly true, leading to equality between the equilibrium levels of the real wage rate and labour's aggregate marginal product, a hypothesis regarded as disproved by all sides during the Cambridge capital controversy. One would thus have a "pure" state of capitalist society where Marx's exploitation theory and its main supposed confutation were both true.

Like Clark's contention about the "fairness" of marginal-productivity wages, so Marx's basic argument—from the "substance" of value to the concept of exploitation—is claimed to be a set of non-analytical and non-empirical propositions. That is why, being non-falsifiable, both theories may be found to apply to the same formal and/or empirical object, though they are supposed to negate each other.

Samuelson not only dismissed the labour theory of value because of the transformation problem, but provided himself, in cooperation with economists like Carl Christian von Weizsäcker, solutions. Von Weizsäcker (1962), along with Samuelson (1971), analysed the problem under the assumption that the economy grows at a constant rate following the Golden Rule of Accumulation. Weizsäcker concludes:

The price of the commodity today is equal to the sum of the 'present' values of the different labour inputs.

Marxian reply to non-Marxian critiques 
The Marxian reply to this mainstream view is as follows. The attempt to discard the theoretical relevance of the necessary preconditions of Marx's value analysis in volume 1 of Capital through a reductio ad absurdum is superficial. By first identifying that the preconditions necessary for J. B. Clark's old model of aggregate marginal productivity to hold true are the same as those necessary for Marxian values to conform to relative prices, we are then supposed to conclude that the foundation of Marx's analysis as based in these preconditions is faulty because Clark's model had been proven wrong in the Cambridge capital controversy. The superficiality stems from the fact that those who support this reduction forget that the Cambridge capital controversy called the entire concept of marginal productivity into question by attacking not Clark's special case assumptions but the notion that physical capital can be aggregated. Marx simply does not run into this problem because his analysis does not rely on an aggregation of physical quantities that receive a return based on their contribution as "factors" of production. The fact that marginal productivity in its aggregate form is "a hypothesis regarded as disproved by all sides during the Cambridge capital controversy" has nothing to do with the validity of the special cases of Marx, and thus we would not "have a "pure" state of capitalist society where Marx's exploitation theory and its main supposed confutation (Clark) were both true", as is concluded from this view, because the "correctness" or "incorrectness" of Clark's aggregate marginal productivity scheme in this case flows not from special case assumptions but from the fact that he is aggregating physical units of capital; i.e., Clark's argument would still not hold true even with the assumed special cases.

To further clarify this point, consider the following. First, it is never possible to provide any absolute scientific proof for the truth of any particular concept of economic value in economics, because the attribution of economic value itself always involves human and moral interpretations that go beyond facts and logic. By nature, the concept of economic value is not a scientifically provable concept but an assumption. Marx himself explicitly ridiculed the idea that he should be required to "prove his concept of value".

Finally, as Piero Sraffa showed, the theory of the production and distribution of a surplus, however it might be devised, is logically independent of any particular theory of the exploitation of labour. Labour exploitation may occur and be conceptualised in various ways, regardless of which theory of value is held to be true. Consequently, if Marx's theory of labour exploitation is false, this is a separate issue.

See also 
 Capital accumulation
Critique of political economy
 Labour theory of value
 Law of value
 Prices of production
 Return of capital
 Socially necessary labour time
 Surplus value
 Temporal single-system interpretation

Notes

References 
 Marx, K. (1859) Zur Kritik der politischen Oeconomie, Berlin (trans. A Contribution to the Critique of Political Economy London 1971).
 Marx, K. (1867) Das Kapital Volume I.
 Marx, K. (1894) Das Kapital Volume III (ed. by F. Engels).
  
  
  
  
  
  
  
 
 Alan Freeman: Price, value and profit - a continuous, general treatment. In: Alan Freeman, Guglielmo Carchedi (editors): Marx and non-equilibrium economics. Edward Elgar. Cheltenham, UK, Brookfield, US 1996.
 Meek, R. (1956)  'Some Notes on the Transformation Problem' Economic Journal 66 (March) 94-107.
  
 Hicks, J. (1969) A Theory of Economic History Oxford.
 Althusser, L. and E. Balibar (1970) Reading 'Capital'  London.
 Samuelson, P.A. (1971) "Understanding the Marxian Notion of Exploitation: A Summary of the So-Called Transformation Problem Between Marxian Values and Competitive Prices" Journal of Economic Literature 9 2 399–431.
 Godelier, M. (1973) Horizon, trajets marxistes en anthropologie Paris.
 Nell, E.J. (1973) 'Marx's Economics. A Dual Theory of Value and Growth: by Micho Morishima' (book review) Journal of Economic Literature XI 1369-71.
 Morishima, M. and G. Catephores (1975) 'Is there an "historical transformation problem"?' Economic Journal 85 (June) 309-28.
 Anwar Shaikh papers: 
 Alan Freeman papers: 
 Fred Moseley papers: 
 Makoto Itoh, The Basic Theory of Capitalism''.
 Gerard Dumenil & Dominique Levy papers 
 Duncan Foley papers 
 Hagendorf, Klaus: Labour Values and the Theory of the Firm. Part I: The Competitive Firm. Paris: EURODOS; 2009.
 Moseley, Fred (1999). "A 'New Solution' for the Transformation Problem: A Sympathetic Critique".

Marxist theory
History of economic thought
Marxian economics